Neuronal tracing, or neuron reconstruction is a technique used in neuroscience to determine the pathway of the neurites or neuronal processes, the axons and dendrites, of a neuron. From a sample preparation point of view, it may refer to some of the following as well as other genetic neuron labeling techniques,

 Anterograde tracing, for labeling from the cell body to synapse;
 Retrograde tracing, for labeling from the synapse to cell body;
 Viral neuronal tracing, for a technique which can be used to label in either direction;
 Manual tracing of neuronal imagery.

In broad sense, neuron tracing is more often related to digital reconstruction of a neuron's morphology from imaging data of above samples.

Digital neuronal reconstruction and neuronal tracing 

Digital reconstruction or tracing of neuron morphology is a fundamental task in computational neuroscience. It is also critical for mapping neuronal circuits based on advanced microscope images, usually based on light microscopy (e.g. laser scanning microscopy, bright field imaging) or electron microscopy or other methods. Due to the high complexity of neuron morphology and often seen heavy noise in such images, as well as the typically encountered massive amount of image data, it has been widely viewed as one of the most challenging computational tasks for computational neuroscience. Many image analysis based methods have been proposed to trace neuron morphology, usually in 3D, manually, semi-automatically or completely automatically. There are normally two processing steps: generation and proof editing of a reconstruction.

History
The need to describe or reconstruct a neuron's morphology probably began in early days of neuroscience when neurons were labeled or visualized using Golgi's methods. Many of the known neuron types, such as pyramidal neurons and Chandelier cells, were described based on their morphological characterization.
The first computer-assisted neuron reconstruction system, now known as Neurolucida, was developed by Dr. Edmund Glaser and Dr. Hendrik Van der Loos in the 1960s.

Modern approaches to trace a neuron started when digitized pictures of neurons were acquired using microscopes. Initially this was done in 2D. Quickly after the advanced 3D imaging, especially the fluorescence imaging and electron microscopic imaging, there were a huge demand of tracing neuron morphology from these imaging data.

Methods

Neurons can be often traced manually either in 2D or 3D. To do so, one may either directly paint the trajectory of neuronal processes in individual 2D sections of a 3D image volume and manage to connect them, or use the 3D Virtual Finger painting which directly converts any 2D painted trajectory in a projection image to real 3D neuron processes. The major limitation of manual tracing of neurons is the huge amount of labor in the work.

Automated reconstructions of neurons can be done using model (e.g. spheres or tubes) fitting and marching, pruning of over-reconstruction, minimal cost connection of key points, ray-bursting and many others. Skeletonization is a critical step in automated neuron reconstruction, but in the case of all-path-pruning and its variants it is combined with estimation of model parameters (e.g. tube diameters). The major limitation of automated tracing is the lack of precision especially when the neuron morphology is complicated or the image has substantial amount of noise.

Semi-automated neuron tracing often depends on two strategies. One is to run the completely automated neuron tracing followed by manual curation of such reconstructions. The alternative way is to produce some prior knowledge, such as the termini locations of a neuron, with which a neuron can be more easily traced automatically. Semi-automated tracing is often thought to be a balanced solution that has acceptable time cost and reasonably good reconstruction accuracy. The open source software Vaa3D-Neuron, Neurolucida 360, Imaris Filament Tracer and Aivia all provide both categories of methods.

Tracing of electron microscopy image is thought to be more challenging than tracing light microscopy images, while the latter is still quite difficult, according to the DIADEM competition. For tracing electron microscopy data, manual tracing is used more often than the alternative automated or semi-automated methods. For tracing light microscopy data, more times the automated or semi-automated methods are used.

Since tracing electron microscopy images takes substantial amount time, collaborative manual tracing software is useful. Crowdsourcing is an alternative way to effectively collect collaborative manual reconstruction results for such image data sets.

Tools and software
A number of neuron tracing tools especially software packages are available. One comprehensive Open Source software package that contains implementation of a number of neuron tracing methods developed in different research groups as well as many neuron utilities functions such as quantitative measurement, parsing, comparison, is Vaa3D and its Vaa3D-Neuron modules. Some other free tools such as NeuronStudio also provide tracing function based on specific methods. Neuroscientists also use commercial tools such as Neurolucida, Neurolucida 360, Aivia, Amira, etc. to trace and analyse neurons. Recent studies show that Neurolucida is cited over 7 times more than all other available neuron tracing programs combined, and is also the most widely used and versatile system to produce neuronal reconstruction. The BigNeuron project (https://alleninstitute.org/bigneuron/about/)  is a recent substantial international collaboration effort to integrate the majority of known neuron tracing tools onto a common platform to facilitate Open Source, easy accessing of various tools at one single place. Powerful new tools such as UltraTracer, that can trace arbitrarily large image volume, have been produced through this effort.

Neuron formats and databases
Reconstructions of single neurons can be stored in various formats. This largely depends on the software that have been used to trace such neurons. The SWC format, which consists of a number of topologically connected structural compartments (e.g. a single tube or sphere), is often used to store digital traced neurons, especially when the morphology lacks or does not need detailed 3D shape models for individual compartments. Other more sophisticated neuron formats have separate geometrical modeling of the neuron cell body and neuron processes using Neurolucida  among others.

There are a few common single neuron reconstruction databases. A widely used database is http://NeuroMorpho.Org  which contains over 86,000 neuron morphology of >40 species contributed worldwide by a number of research labs. Allen Institute for Brain Science, HHMI's Janelia Research Campus, and other institutes are also generating large-scale single neuron databases. Many of related neuron data databases at different scales also exist.

References

Neuroscience
Cellular neuroscience